Dominique Rustichelli (born 26 June 1934) is a French former professional footballer who played as a striker. Between 1952 and 1958 he played for Olympique de Marseille, scoring 34 goals in 138 league appearances. He then played in a number of other teams before retiring.

References

External links
 
 

1934 births
Living people
Footballers from Marseille
Association football forwards
French footballers
Olympique de Marseille players
CS Sedan Ardennes players
RC Strasbourg Alsace players
Stade de Reims players
OGC Nice players
Stade Français (association football) players
Lille OSC players
FC Rouen players